European route E53 forms part of the International E-road network. It begins in Plzeň, Czech Republic, and ends in Munich, Germany.

Its route is: Plzeň – Deggendorf – Landshut – Munich.

External links 
 UN Economic Commission for Europe: Overall Map of E-road Network (2007)

53
E053
053